Elisabeth Post (born 27 July 1965) is a Dutch politician who served as a member of the Provincial-Executive of North Holland from 2009 to 2019. She is a member of the People's Party for Freedom and Democracy (VVD).

Career
Elected to the municipal council of Hilversum from 1994 to 2006 for the People's Party for Freedom and Democracy, Post chaired the party's group during her last four years in office. In the 2007 provincial election, she was elected to the Provincial Council of North Holland. Two years later, she became a member of the Provincial-Executive. She also served as Acting Queen's Commissioner of North Holland after the resignation of Harry Borghouts.

She was lijstrekker for the VVD in the 2011 provincial election. In 2019, she stepped down from the Provincial-Executive to become chairwoman of the Transport en Logistiek Nederland (TLN) business organisation, which was previously chaired by newly-installed King's Commissionner of North Holland Arthur van Dijk.

References

1965 births
Living people
20th-century Dutch politicians
20th-century Dutch women politicians
21st-century Dutch politicians
21st-century Dutch women politicians
Dutch civil servants
King's and Queen's Commissioners of North Holland
Members of the Provincial Council of North Holland
Members of the Provincial-Executive of North Holland
Municipal councillors of Hilversum
People's Party for Freedom and Democracy politicians
Women King's and Queen's Commissioners of the Netherlands